KD Laksamana Tan Pusmah (F137) is the fourth Laksamana-class corvette currently in service with the 24th corvette Squadron of the Royal Malaysian Navy. She built by Italian company Fincantieri based on the Type 550 corvette design.

Development

The Laksamana-class corvettes of the Royal Malaysian Navy are modified s built by Fincantieri, Italy. They were originally ordered by Iraqi Navy in February 1981. The corvettes were never delivered to Iraq and instead refitted and sold to Malaysia in mid 1990s.

Service history

Laksamana Tan Pusmah were originally ordered by the Iraqi Navy as Salah Ad Din Alayoobi (F220). Her keel was laid down on 17 September 1982, launched on 30 March 1984 and she was completed in 1988. Upon her completion, Salah Ad Din Alayoobi was laid up at Muggiano due to trade embargo during Iran–Iraq War that prevented her from being delivered to Iraq. She was finally released for delivery in 1990, but as Iraq was again embargoed following its invasion of Kuwait, the ship was kept laid up by Fincantieri. It was proposed that she would be requisitioned by Italian Navy or sold to either Morocco or Colombia.

Royal Malaysian Navy signed a contract with Fincantieri for Salah Ad Din Alayoobi and her sister Abdullah Ibn Abi Serh on 20 February 1997. She and her sister were refitted at Muggiano and later arrived in Malaysia in September 1999. The ship was commissioned as KD Laksamana Tan Pusmah on 31 July 1999. Since 1997, she served tenaciously and close to the end of their lifespan. Due to this, RMN confirmed that she and other sister ships will be going to refit to extending their service life and improving combat capabilities.

References

 
 
 

Corvette classes
Laksamana-class corvettes
Corvettes of Malaysia
Ships built by Fincantieri
1984 ships